"Back & Forth" is a song by Costa Rica  DJ and record producer MK,  DJ and record producer Jonas Blue and English singer Becky Hill. It was released as a digital download on September 7, 2018, via sppinin records In December 2018, it gained airplay in Mexico across various radio stations devoted to Top 40 music.

Music video
A music video to accompany the release of "Back & Forth" was first released onto YouTube on 23 October 2018 at a total length of three minutes and twenty-two seconds.

Commercial performance
On September 14, 2018, the song entered at number 52 on the UK Singles Chart. The song reached the Top 40 on October 5, 2018, charting at number 37, and reached number 21 the next week. The track climbed to number 17 in its sixth week.

Track listing

Charts

Certifications

Release history

References

 

2018 songs
2018 singles
MK (DJ) songs
Becky Hill songs
Jonas Blue songs
Songs written by Jonas Blue
Songs written by Marc Kinchen
Songs written by Becky Hill